Hallgrim Kløve (22 June 1927 – 25 January 2010) was a Norwegian psychologist.

Kløve was born in Moss. He was assigned as researcher at the Indiana University, and was appointed professor at the University of Wisconsin in 1970. He worked at the University of Bergen from 1971. His research fields were neuropsychology and epilepsy.

References

1927 births
2010 deaths
People from Moss, Norway
Norwegian psychologists
Indiana University faculty
University of Wisconsin–Madison faculty
Academic staff of the University of Bergen
Norwegian expatriates in the United States